

2004 Angola Men's Basketball Cup
Petro Atlético won the trophy by beating Primeiro de Agosto 93-73 in the final played on May 23, 2004 at the Pavilhão da Cidadela.

2004 Angola Women's Basketball Cup
The 2004 Women's Basketball Cup was contested by five teams that played a preliminary round robin, the top two of which played the final at the best of three games Primeiro de Agosto A was the winner.

Preliminary rounds

Day 1

Day 2

Day 3

Day 4

Day 5

Knockout round

See also
 2004 Angola Basketball Super Cup
 2004 BAI Basket

References

Angola Basketball Cup seasons
Cup